Bathyclarias foveolatus is a species of airbreathing catfish endemic to Lake Malawi, in the countries of Malawi, Mozambique and Tanzania.  This species grows to a length of 75 cm SL (29.5 inches).

References
 

Bathyclarias
Fish of Africa
Fish described in 1955
Taxonomy articles created by Polbot